Classica Citta di Padova was a women's one-day cycle race which took place in Italy and was ranked by the UCI as 1.1 in 2013 and 1.2 in 2012 having been Nationally ranked in previous seasons.

Previous winners

References

 
Women's road bicycle races
Cycle races in Italy
Defunct cycling races in Italy
Recurring sporting events established in 2008
2008 establishments in Italy
Recurring sporting events disestablished in 2013
2013 disestablishments in Italy
Sport in Padua